Chengnan Subdistrict is a subdistrict in the center of Changping District, Beijing, China. It shares border with Chengbei Subdistrict to its north, Nanshao Town to its east, Machikou Area to its south and west, and has an exclave west of Chengbei Subdistrict. It had a census population of 88,963 in 2020.

The name Chengnan originates from the subdistrict's location south of an once-existed city gate of Changping.

History

Administrative divisions 

As of 2021, 21 subdivisions constituted Chengnan Subdistrict, of which 16 were communities, and 5 were villages:

Gallery

See also 

 List of township-level divisions of Beijing

References 

Changping District
Subdistricts of Beijing